Federico D'Incà (born 10 February 1976) is an Italian politician, who is member of the Chamber of Deputies for the Five Star Movement. On 5 September 2019, he was appointed as Minister for Parliamentary Relations in the Conte II Cabinet.

Early life and career
D'Incà graduated in economics and commerce from the University of Trento. He was an IT management systems analyst in a private company until 2013, and previously was a senior manager in a multinational large-scale retail trade and quality manager in a robotics and automation company. He is a managing director of the Italy–USA Foundation.

Politics
In the 2013 general elections he was elected deputy of the 17th legislature of the Italian Republic in the Veneto 2 constituency for the Five Star Movement. since 17 December 2013 he has been the group leader of the M5S in the Chamber of Deputies, taking over from Alessio Villarosa of which he was already deputy group leader. Riccardo Nuti, previously the group leader, however, remained officially president of the group for technical-bureaucratic reasons due to the parliamentary organization until 4 September 2014 when his predecessor Villarosa officially became one.

On 26 March 2015 he officially became president of the M5S parliamentary group, thus legally representing the group in administrative and bureaucratic areas.

In 2016 he held the role of vice president of the Parliamentary Commission of Inquiry for the digitization of the Public Administration.

Re-elected in 2018 again with the M5S, he was appointed quaestor of the Chamber of Deputies. He is a member of the Budget, Treasury and Planning Commission, the Communication and External Information Committee, the Supervisory Committee on Documentation Activities, the Personnel Affairs Committee, the Security Committee.

On 5 September 2019 he has been appointed Minister for Relations with the Parliament of the Conte II Government. On 3 October 2019 he also received the delegation for the Reforms.

He remained in office in the Draghi Cabinet.

On 30 July 2022, he left the M5S and on 1 August, alongside Member of the Chamber of Deputies Davide Crippa, he founded Environment 2050, a progressive and environmentalist political organization.

References

External links 
 Official website

Politicians of Veneto
1976 births
Living people
21st-century Italian politicians
Conte II Cabinet
Draghi Cabinet
Five Star Movement politicians
University of Trento alumni
People from Belluno
Deputies of Legislature XVII of Italy
Deputies of Legislature XVIII of Italy
Government ministers of Italy
20th-century Italian people